Center Valley may refer to:

Center Valley, Arkansas
Center Valley, Indiana
Center Valley, Morgan County, Indiana
Center Valley, Pennsylvania
Center Valley, Wisconsin

See also
Valley Center (disambiguation)